Lightburn may refer to:
Lightburn, Glasgow
Lightburn, an area of Halfway, South Lanarkshire, Scotland
Lightburn, West Virginia
Lightburn & Co, Australian manufacturer of concrete mixers, washing machines and the Zeta automobile
Murray Lightburn, Canadian singer/songwriter